Trillion is a number, either 1,000,000,000,000 (short scale) or 1,000,000,000,000,000,000 (long scale).

Trillion or Trillions may also refer to:

 Trillion (horse) (1974–1987), a French Thoroughbred racing mare
 Trillion (band), led by Dennis Frederiksen
 Trillion, a performer in the English hip pop quintet KING
 Trillions, a 1971 science fiction novel by Nicholas Fisk
 One trillion (basketball), specific box score of a basketball player
 Trilliant cut, or trillion, a triangular type of gemstone cut
 Trillion Fund, an equity crowdfunding platform

See also
 
 Trillian (disambiguation)
 Trillionaire (disambiguation)
 Trillium (disambiguation)
 TN (disambiguation)
 1T (disambiguation)
 Names of large numbers
 Long and short scales